Brangman is a surname. Notable people with the surname include:

Derrick Brangman (born 1987), Bermudian cricketer
Donte Brangman (born 1994), Bermudian footballer
Goldie Brangman-Dumpson (1920–2020), American nurse and educator
Ricardo Brangman (born 1980), Bermudian cricketer